The Minister for Foreign Affairs is the Ghana government official who is responsible for overseeing the country's foreign policy and international diplomacy. The foreign minister is usually one of the most senior members of Cabinet. Under military regimes in Ghana, the title; minister has been replaced with commissioner or secretary.

The Minister for Foreign Affairs since January 2017 has been Honorable Shirley Ayorkor Botchway. The ministry is at present combined with other portfolios to form the Ministry of Foreign Affairs and Regional Integration under the government of Nana Akufo-Addo of the New Patriotic Party.

List of Ghanaian Foreign Ministers
External Affairs 
 
 
Foreign Affairs

See also

Ministers of the Ghanaian Government
List of current foreign ministers
Foreign relations of Ghana
List of Ambassadors and High Commissioners of Ghana

Notes

External links and sources
Ministry of Foreign Affairs and Regional Integration, official Website
Current Minister for Foreign Affairs on the Ghana government website
Rulers.org - Foreign Ministers

Politics of Ghana
Foreign minister